Yongxing County is a county in Hunan Province, China, it is under the administration of the prefecture-level city of Chenzhou.

Located on the south eastern part of the province, it is adjacent to the north of the city proper in Chenzhou. The county borders to the northwest by Leiyang City, to the southwest by Guiyang County, to the south by Suxian District, to the southeast by Zixing City, to the northeast by Anren County. The county has 11 towns and four townships under its jurisdiction, the county seat is Bianjiang Town.

Administrative divisions
11 towns
 Bianjiang
 Bolin
 Gaotingsi
 Huangni
 Jingui
 Liyutang
 Matian
 Taihe
 Youma
 Yuelai
 Zhangshu

4 townships
 Dabujiang
 Longxingshi
 Qijia
 Yangtang

Transportation 
Yongxing's transport links include the National Highway 212, the Beijing to Guangzhou Railway and the Beijing to Zhuhai Expressway constitute a transport network covering this area that allows local people to make one-day round-trip to cities like Changsha to the north or Guangzhou to the south.

Economy 
Silver is an important industry in Yongxing, which is nicknamed “China’s Silver Capital”.  As of 2003, Yongxing's GDP reached 3.68 billion yuan and its public revenue was 245 million yuan. The average annual personal income of its urban and rural residents was 6,820 and 3,304 yuan, respectively.

Climate

References

www.xzqh.org 

 
County-level divisions of Hunan
Geography of Chenzhou